Bolo, also known as Bulu, is a sweet, round bread of Sephardi Jewish origin which is commonly prepared by Tunisian Jews, Libyan Jews, and Italian Jews, among others, for the high holidays such as Rosh Hashanah and for other special occasions.

Overview

Bolo is a sweet, round bread that is commonly flavored with anise, although it can contain nuts or other flavorings as well. The bread can be eaten at any time but is most common during the Jewish High Holiday season. The bread was very popular among the Sephardic Jewish community of North Africa, and with their exodus to Israel, France, and North America, it has become a part of the local Jewish cuisine in these countries as well and Sephardic Jews continue to make bolo to this day. It is also eaten by Persian Jews as well, who call it bulu.

References

Jewish baked goods
Jewish breads
Sweet breads
Sephardi Jewish cuisine
Mizrahi Jewish cuisine
Israeli cuisine
Rosh Hashanah foods
Anise
Iranian cuisine